A sailor suit is a uniform traditionally worn by enlisted seamen in a navy or other governmental sea services. It later developed into a popular clothing style for children, especially as dress clothes.

Origins and history
In the Royal Navy, the sailor suit, also called naval rig, is known as Number One dress and is worn by able rates and leading hands. It is primarily ceremonial, although it dates from the old working rig of Royal Navy sailors which has continuously evolved since its first introduction in 1857. Versions have been adopted by many navies from around the world.

The flap collar is perhaps the most recognizable item of the sailor suit. It is often considered lucky to touch a sailor's collar. The bell-bottomed trousers were designed so that they could be rolled up easily when scrubbing the decks.

As children's clothing

In 1846, the four-year-old Albert Edward, Prince of Wales was given a scaled-down version of the uniform worn by ratings on the Royal Yacht. He wore his miniature sailor suit during a cruise off the Channel Islands that September, delighting his mother and the public. Popular engravings, including the famous portrait done by Winterhalter, spread the idea, and by the 1870s the sailor suit had become a fashionable dress for both boys and girls in many countries. Some Western cartoon and comic characters use a sailor suit as their trademarks; examples include Popeye, Donald Duck, and Fiddler Pig. Sailor suits have been worn by the members of the Vienna Boys' Choir on their international tours.

A female version of the sailor suit, the sailor dress, was popularly known in early 20th century America as a Peter Thomson dress after a naval tailor with outlets in New York and Philadelphia.

Asian school uniforms
Many schools in some Asian countries, including Japan, the Philippines, Taiwan, North Korea, South Korea, Hong Kong, Singapore, and Thailand, have adopted sailor outfits as a school uniform.

Japan
 
Sailor suits are especially common in Japanese girls' schools, known as sailor fuku by the Japanese. They are so common that the image of the outfit has evolved to be strongly associated with youth and female adolescence in popular culture. As a result, sailor uniforms are seen very frequently in Japanese dramas, movies, anime, manga, music videos and concert performances of pop teen idol groups.

Philippines
Just like in Japan, sailor uniforms are also common in Philippine schools, particularly in high schools. Most public schools adopted the sailor uniform as the official uniform for the girls and some of them adopted with derivatives.

See also

Sailor dress
Marinière
Telnyashka
Uniforms of the Royal Navy
Uniforms of the United States Navy

References

External links 

 National Maritime Museum

19th-century fashion
Children's clothing
Sailing
Suits (clothing)
Uniforms
Maritime culture